Colonel William A. R. Robertson was a senior officer in the United States Army and United States Air Force who served as Chief of the Air Division, National Guard Bureau from 1945 to 1948.

References

Further reading
HEADQUARTERS UNITED STATES AIR FORCE KEY PERSONNEL
Leaders through the years
The History of the U.S. Air Force

National Guard (United States) officers
Recipients of the Legion of Merit
United States Air Force officers
United States Army Air Forces personnel of World War II